Consider Your Verdict is an Australian television series made by Crawford Productions for the Seven Network originally screening from February 1961 through to June 1964. It was based on a radio series with the same name broadcast on 3DB in Melbourne from 1958 to 1960.

Production
The television series was recorded at the HSV-7 Fitzroy tele-theatre in Melbourne. There were 163 one-hour episode. The series was also popular in New Zealand.

Synopsis 
The series made use of a revolving cast to portray various court cases. The actors were given the details of a given case and instructed to improvise their performances to give the series a more authentic, immediate feel.

Notable Episodes
Queen Versus Bent starring Harold Blair

Awards 
It won a Logie Award in 1961 for Best Australian Drama Series

References

External links
Consider Your Verdict at Classic Australian Television
Consider Your Verdict at the National Film and Sound Archive

Australian drama television series
Australian legal television series
Black-and-white Australian television shows
English-language television shows
Seven Network original programming
Television shows set in Victoria (Australia)
1961 Australian television series debuts
1964 Australian television series endings
Television series by Crawford Productions